The 1984 Vermont gubernatorial election took place on November 6, 1984. Incumbent Republican Richard A. Snelling did not run for another term as Governor of Vermont. Democratic candidate Madeleine Kunin defeated Republican candidate John J. Easton Jr. to succeed him. Kunin's win coincided with the presidential election, which saw Republican Ronald Reagan win Vermont with nearly 58% of the vote.

Republican primary

Results

Democratic primary

Results

Liberty Union primary

Results

General election

Results

References

Vermont
1984
Gubernatorial